Adrian Jackson may refer to:

 Adrian Jackson (musician) (born 1970), former bassist for the band My Dying Bride
 Adrian Jackson (theatre director), founder-director of the theatre company, Cardboard Citizens in the UK
 Adrian Jackson (orienteer), Australian mountain bike orienteering competitor and World Champion
 J. Adrian Jackson, rear admiral in the U.S. Navy
 Adrian Township, Jackson County, Kansas